Kabisa Gewog (Dzongkha: དཀར་སྦི་ས་) is a gewog (village block) of Punakha District, Bhutan.

References 

Gewogs of Bhutan
Punakha District